The Roman Catholic Diocese of Lindi is a diocese located in Lindi in the Ecclesiastical province of Songea in Tanzania.

History
 August 5, 1963: Established as Diocese of Nachingwea from the Territorial Abbacy of Mtwara
 October 17, 1986: Renamed as Diocese of Lindi

Leadership
 Bishops of Nachingwea 
 Arnold Ralph Cotey, S.D.S. (1963.08.05 – 1983.11.11)
 Polycarp Pengo (1983.11.11 – 1986.10.17), appointed bishop of Tunduru-Masasi, later cardinal
 Bishops of Lindi 
 Maurus Libaba (1986.10.17 – 1988.03.03)
 Bruno Pius Ngonyani (1990.10.06 – 2022.04.09)
 Wolfgang Pisa, O.F.M.Cap. (since 2022.04.09)

See also
Roman Catholicism in Tanzania

Sources
 GCatholic.org
 Catholic Hierarchy

Lindi
Lindi
Christian organizations established in 1963
Roman Catholic dioceses and prelatures established in the 20th century
Lindi, Roman Catholic Diocese of